Boards of improvement commissioners were ad hoc urban local government boards created during the 18th and 19th centuries in the United Kingdom of Great Britain and Ireland and its predecessors the Kingdom of Great Britain and the Kingdom of Ireland. Around 300 boards were created, each by a private Act of Parliament, typically termed an Improvement Act. The powers of the boards varied according to the acts which created them. They often included street paving, cleansing, lighting, providing watchmen or dealing with various public nuisances. Those with restricted powers might be called lighting commissioners, paving commissioners, police commissioners, etc.

Older urban government forms included the corporations of ancient boroughs, vestries of parishes, and in some cases the lord of the manor. These were ill-equipped for the larger populations of the Industrial Revolution: the most powerful in theory, the corporations, were also the most corrupt; and many new industrial towns lacked borough status. While Binfield  states that the first improvement commission in Great Britain was the Manchester Police Commission, established in 1765, followed by the Birmingham Street Commissioners in 1769, the Webbs list the Commissioners of Scotland Yard, formed in 1662 for sewerage and street-cleaning in the City of London and City of Westminster, and then New Sarum in 1736 and Liverpool in 1748, as well as various harbour commissioners from 1698. Jones and Falkus give the number of such bodies created:

Improvement Acts empowered the commissioners to fund their work by levying rates. Some acts specified named individuals to act as commissioners, who replenished their number by co-option. Other commissions held elections at which all ratepayers could vote, or took all those paying above a certain rate as automatic members. During the mid-19th century, some commissions came under Chartist control, for example, the Manchester Police and Gas Commissions, the Leeds Improvement Commission, the Bradford Highway Commission and the Sheffield Highway Commission.

Improvement commissioners were gradually superseded by reformed municipal boroughs (from 1835) and boards of health (from 1848), which absorbed commissioners' powers by promoting private acts. Harbour commissioners remained separate in many cases, and they or their successor body are the competent harbour authority in many UK ports.

In Ireland the first and best known improvement commission was the Dublin Wide Streets Commission in 1757, which covered the area of Dublin Corporation and the adjoining Liberties. Newtown Pery was governed by improvement commissioners from 1807 until 1853, when it was absorbed into Limerick city. The Municipal Corporations (Ireland) Act 1840 abolished most corporations, but the ad hoc improvement commissioners were superseded by standardised town commissioners appointed under the terms of Acts of Parliament of 1828 and later.

List

Note for table: 'ICD' stands for improvement commissioners district.

Pre-1848

Post-1848

Sources

References

See also
 Special district (United States)

 
Local government in the United Kingdom